SOTY may refer to:

 Sok Soty, Cambodian politician
 Skater of the Year, an award given by Thrasher magazine
 Song of the Year (disambiguation), a name of several awards honoring the best song of the past year
 Story of the Year, an American rock band
 Student of the Year, a 2012 Indian film by Karan Johar
 Student of the Year 2, a 2019 Indian film, sequel of the 2012 film